The Precipice Sandstone is a Hettangian geologic formation found in the Surat Basin of Queensland and New South Wales in Australia. Fossil ornithopod and theropod tracks have been reported from the formation.

See also 
 List of dinosaur-bearing rock formations
 List of stratigraphic units with ornithischian tracks
 Ornithopod tracks

References

Bibliography 
 Weishampel, David B.; Dodson, Peter; and Osmólska, Halszka (eds.): The Dinosauria, 2nd, Berkeley: University of California Press. 861 pp. .

Further reading 
 R. E. Molnar. 1991. Fossil reptiles in Australia. In P. Vickers-Rich, J. M. Monaghan, R. F. Baird, & T. H. Rich (eds.), Vertebrate Paleontology of Australasia 605-702

Geologic formations of Australia
Jurassic System of Australia
Hettangian Stage
Sandstone formations
Paleontology in New South Wales
Paleontology in Queensland